In total, 75 cricket grounds have hosted at least one match of women's Test cricket.

Ten countries have hosted at least one women's Test match, which corresponds to the number of teams that have played at least one Test. However, four of those countries – Ireland, the Netherlands, Pakistan, and Sri Lanka – have hosted only a single match, while two others, Jamaica and South Africa, have hosted only two and eight, respectively. Consequently, the vast majority of Test venues have been located in only four countries – Australia, England, India, and New Zealand. Australian and English venues alone make up over half of the list. Most of the grounds have hosted only a single Test match, with multiple Tests at one venue being the exception rather than the rule. Only three venues have hosted more than five Tests, all located in England – Worcester's New Road ground has hosted nine games, London's Kennington Oval has hosted six, and Scarborough's North Marine Road ground has hosted five.

List of grounds
Last updated: 30 June 2022.

Source Cricinfo Cricinfo

Grounds by country

See also
 List of Test cricket grounds
 List of One Day International cricket grounds
 List of women's One Day International cricket grounds
 List of Twenty20 International cricket grounds
 List of women's Twenty20 International cricket grounds

References

External links 
Cricinfo – Grounds

Test, women
Grounds
Women's cricket-related lists